Barry Ferguson (born 7 September 1979) is an Irish former professional football player and currently a development officer with the Football Association of Ireland.

Career
Ferguson began his football career with Home Farm before moving to Coventry City. While there he played at the FIFA World Youth Championship finals in Nigeria in 1999. Although he never made a competitive first team appearance for City, Ferguson went on to have brief spells in the lower divisions with Colchester United, Hartlepool United and Northampton Town.

Ferguson returned to Ireland to link up with Longford Town in the summer of 2002. He captained FAI Cup and League Cup winning teams during his three years at the midlands club. Ferguson scored in a 2004–05 UEFA Cup tie against FC Vaduz. As Longford's penalty taker he missed the chance for an equaliser in the last minute of the 2003 FAI League Cup Final.

He made his Rovers debut on the opening day of the 2007 League of Ireland season at UCD. He signed for the club from city rivals Bohemians in January 2007, having spent just one season with the Dalymount outfit.

Ferguson was forced to retire in February 2009 due to a serious hip injury.

Personal life
He is the father of Brighton & Hove Albion player Evan Ferguson.

Honours
Longford Town
FAI Cup: 2003, 2004
League of Ireland Cup: 2004

References

1979 births
Living people
Association footballers from Dublin (city)
Republic of Ireland association footballers
Home Farm F.C. players
Colchester United F.C. players
Hartlepool United F.C. players
Northampton Town F.C. players
Longford Town F.C. players
Bohemian F.C. players
Shamrock Rovers F.C. players
Sporting Fingal F.C. players
Coventry City F.C. players
League of Ireland players
Republic of Ireland under-21 international footballers
Republic of Ireland youth international footballers
Association football defenders